Mick Heenan is an Australian professional rugby union coach. He was the head coach of the Brisbane City team that played in the defunct National Rugby Championship competition. He was the head coach at the University of Queensland, winning the Hospital Cup in 2010, 2012, 2014, 2017, 2019 and 2021. He is now an assistant coach with the Queensland Reds.

References

Living people
Australian rugby union coaches
Year of birth missing (living people)